The  were a pair of large armored cruisers (Sōkō jun'yōkan) built for the Imperial Japanese Navy (IJN) in the first decade of the 20th century. Construction began during the Russo-Japanese War of 1904–05 and their design was influenced by the IJN's experiences during the war. The British development of the battlecruiser the year after  was completed made her and her sister ship  obsolete, as they were slower and more weakly armed than the British, and later German, ships. Despite this, they were reclassified in 1912 as battlecruisers by the IJN.

Both ships played a small role in World War I as they unsuccessfully hunted for the German East Asia Squadron in late 1914. They became training ships later in the war. Tsukuba was destroyed in an accidental magazine explosion in 1917 and subsequently scrapped. Her sister was disarmed in 1922 in accordance with the terms of the Washington Naval Treaty and broken up for scrap in 1924.

Background

About a month after the Russo-Japanese War began in February 1904, the Japanese Diet authorized a temporary special budget of ¥48,465,631 that would last until the end of the war. It included the 1904 War Naval Supplementary Program which authorized construction of two battleships and four armored cruisers, among other ships. Two of the latter became the Tsukuba-class cruisers which were ordered on 23 June.

Based on the experience at the Battle of the Yellow Sea in August 1904 where the Russians opened fire at ranges well beyond what had been anticipated before the war, the IJN decided to arm the ships with  45-calibre (45 feet long barrel) guns, which outranged the 12" 40-calibre guns used by the Japanese battleships in the war. The increase in armament was also justified by a change in the IJN's doctrine for these ships in which they were now intended to participate in the line of battle and overpower the enemy's screening armored cruisers. The Tsukubas were "briefly the world's most powerful cruisers in service until the completion of the first true battlecruisers, the British ". They were also the first capital ships to be designed and constructed entirely by Japan in a Japanese shipyard.

This type of warships with speed of a cruiser and the firepower and protection armor of a battleship was advocated by First Sea Lord Jacky Fisher who coined the term 'battlecruiser' for the type in the UK later in 1908.

Design and description
The Tsukuba-class design was very similar to that of the British  armored cruiser, albeit some  larger. The Japanese ships were shorter and beamier, but shape of the hull and the positioning of the armament was almost identical, although the traditional ram bow was replaced by a clipper-style bow. The adoption of more powerful Miyabara water-tube boilers by the IJN allowed the number of boilers to be reduced from 30 in the British ships to 20 in the Tsukuba-class ships with no loss of power or speed. This reduced the length required for their propulsion machinery and allowed the larger guns and their ammunition to be accommodated.

The crew numbered about 820 officers and enlisted men.

The Tsukuba-class ships had two 4-cylinder vertical triple-expansion steam engines, each driving a single propeller shaft.

Armament
The Tsukuba-class armored cruisers were armed with four 45-caliber 12-inch 41st Year Type guns. The guns were mounted in twin-gun hydraulically powered centerline turrets, one each fore and aft of the superstructure. The guns had an elevation range of −3° to +23° and normally loaded their rounds at an angle of +5°, although loading at any angle up to +13° was theoretically possible. Their secondary armament consisted of a dozen Elswick Ordnance Company "Pattern GG" 45-caliber  guns mounted in armored casemates on the middle and main decks. The eight guns on the middle deck were very close to the waterline and could not be used in bad weather.

Close-range defense against torpedo boats consisted of twelve quick-firing (QF) 4.7-inch 41st Year Type guns. Four of these were mounted in casemates in the bow and stern, while the remaining guns were positioned on the upper deck and protected by gun shields. The ships were also equipped with four 40-caliber QF 12-pounder 12-cwt guns. The Tsukuba-class ships were equipped with three submerged torpedo tubes, one on each broadside, and one in the stern.

Armor
In order to keep the displacement down and the speed the same as in the earlier armored cruisers, armor in the Tsukuba class was about the same in thickness, although in an improved layout. Above it was a strake of  armor that extended between the barbettes and protected the 6-inch casemates. The aft ends of the main armor belt were connected to the main gun barbettes by  transverse bulkheads. The lack of a forward bulkhead and the thinness of the aft bulkhead were serious weaknesses in the ships' protection.

The main barbettes were protected by seven inches of armour.

Ships in class

Construction and service
The Yokosuka Naval Arsenal had the most experience in building warships, but the IJN feared a bombardment by the Russian 2nd and 3rd Pacific Squadrons then en route from the Baltic Sea and decided to build the Tsukubas at the less-exposed Kure Naval Arsenal, even though Kure's experience was with ship repair and conversions. This meant that skilled workers had to be brought from Yokosuka to train the workforce at Kure in construction techniques. Tsukuba was laid down after the newly constructed Slipway No. 3 was completed in November 1904 and Ikoma followed once the extension of Slipway No. 2 was finished. These ships were over three times larger than the biggest ship previously built in Japan, the  protected cruiser . Priority of effort was given to the building of Tsukuba and she was completed in a very creditable two years. Ikoma took an additional year to finish as the end of the war shortly after she was laid down reduced the pressure to complete her as fast as possible. In addition, her slipway initially lacked any cranes or derricks to lift heavy material until electrically powered steel shearleg derricks were improvised. Construction of both ships was somewhat delayed by difficulties in procuring enough steel plates and rivets; quantities of both had to be imported from the United States.

Possibly due to the speed at which she was constructed, Tsukuba reportedly suffered from numerous defects. Shortly after she was completed, the ship sailed for America where she participated in the Jamestown Exposition Naval Review in May–June 1907. The ship then sailed to Europe where she made numerous port visits over the next several months. While in Britain, Tsukuba was fitted with a Vickers fire-control system that calculated the firing data for each gun and with which the gunnery officer fired the guns in unison. Ikoma visited England in July 1910 as part of the Japan–British Exhibition.

The Tsukuba-class ships were reclassified as battlecruisers in 1912. Around 1913–14, the main deck 6-inch guns were removed and six were reinstalled on the upper deck where they replaced four 4.7-inch guns. This gave them a total of ten 6-inch and eight 4.7-inch guns. Shortly after the beginning of World War I in August 1914, Tsukuba was assigned to the 1st South Seas Squadron that searched for the East Asia Squadron in the German-owned islands in the Central Pacific. On 7 October, a landing party from the ship occupied Ponape in the Caroline Islands. Ikoma joined the squadron in November, shortly before it moved to Fiji in December. Tsukuba was assigned as a gunnery training ship in 1916. By 1917, both ships were assigned to the 2nd Division and Tsukuba was sunk by a magazine explosion on 14 January with the loss of 305 crewmen; her wreck was later salvaged and scrapped.

Ikoma became a gunnery training ship in her turn in 1918 and her armament was augmented by a pair of 8 cm/40 3rd Year Type anti-aircraft (AA) guns the following year. She was re-rated back to first-class cruiser in 1921 and disarmed in 1922 to fulfill the requirements of the Washington Naval Treaty. The ship was broken up in November 1924.

Notes

Footnotes

References

 

 
 
 

Battlecruiser classes
Cruiser classes